Huntsman Corporation is an American multinational manufacturer and marketer of chemical products for consumers and industrial customers. Huntsman manufactures assorted polyurethanes, performance products, and adhesives for customers like BMW, GE, Chevron, Procter & Gamble, Unilever and Walkaroo.With global headquarters in The Woodlands, Texas, it operates more than 70 manufacturing, R&D and operations facilities in over 30 countries and employ approximately 9,000 associates across four business divisions. Huntsman Corporation had 2020 revenues of approximately $6 billion.

History
The Huntsman Corporation was initially founded as the Huntsman Container Corporation in 1970 by Alonzo Blaine Huntsman Jr. and his younger brother Jon Huntsman, Sr. It went public as the Huntsman Corporation on the New York Stock Exchange  in February 2005. Huntsman has grown through a series of acquisitions (with some divestitures) and today is a manufacturer and marketer of differentiated and specialty chemical products.

In April 1994, Huntsman acquired the Texaco Chemical company for $1.1 billion. Texaco Inc. agreed to sell its last remaining petrochemicals plant to Huntsman in 1999 for about $600 million.

The Huntsman Corporation became the then third-largest petrochemical business in the United States when in 1999, it acquired Imperial Chemical Industries' polyurethanes, titanium dioxide, aromatics and petrochemical global businesses for $2.8 billion.

Huntsman also acquired the Performance Additives and Titanium Dioxide (TiO2) businesses of Rockwood Holdings, Inc. on October 1, 2014, to become the largest color and white pigments company in the world. Huntsman paid approximately $1 billion in cash and assumed certain unfunded European pension liabilities.

Huntsman Building Solutions Created

Huntsman named its spray polyurethane foam (SPF) business as Huntsman Building Solutions (HBS) in May, 2020.  The SPF business was formed when Huntsman acquired leading North American SPF company Icynene-Lapolla in February 2020 and combined it with Demilec, which Huntsman acquired in 2018.  Huntsman is now the fifth largest insulation manufacturer in the world.

Proposed Merger of Equals: HuntsmanClariant

In May 2017, Huntsman and Clariant announced that they would merge, as equals, forming HuntsmanClariant which would be the global leader in speciality chemical production - with the deal valued at $20 billion. Clariant shareholders would own 52% of the new entity, with Huntsman shareholders owning the remaining 48% of shares.

The merger agreement was terminated on October 27, 2017.

IPO of Venator

Huntsman Corporation spun-off its Pigments and Additives division as Venator Materials in an initial public offering on August 8, 2017.

Venator became the owner of Huntsman's Titanium Dioxide and Performance Additives businesses, which offers products comprising a broad range of pigments and additives that add performance and color to many everyday items. Venator is a global company with more than 4,300 employees across 27 facilities in more than 10 countries.

Terminated Takeover by Access Industries
In June 2007, it was announced that Huntsman had agreed to be acquired by Access Industries, owned by the billionaire Len Blavatnik, for $5.88 billion in cash. Huntsman shareholders would receive $25.25 a share from Access Industries' chemical unit, Basell Holdings, based in Hoofddorp, Netherlands. Access would assume $3.7 billion of Huntsman debt.

However, on July 12, 2007, the agreement was terminated as Huntsman agreed to be bought by Apollo Management for $6.51 billion or $28 a share. Huntsman filed a suit against Apollo Management and its two partners in Texas after the group backed out of the deal to purchase the chemical company. The suit alleged fraud against Apollo Management as Huntsman believed that the group never intended to allow its Hexion Specialty Chemicals unit to buy Huntsman Corp. for $6.5 billion. Huntsman also claimed Apollo put forth a higher bid to prevent the Basell AF buyout as it would have threatened Hexion's market share. Hexion stated Huntsman's declining financial position as the reason the deal was terminated. Upon termination of the Hexion merger agreement, the Huntsman stock value dropped by almost 50%.

In December 2008, Apollo and Hexion agreed to pay Huntsman $1.1 billion in return for Huntsman dropping all charges against them. This includes $500 million in cash, a $250 million investment in Huntsman, and an additional $425 million in cash, repayable by separate suits against Credit Suisse.

Starboard stake
Activist hedge fund Starboard disclosed a stake in the company in 2021. The hedge fund owned more than 8% of Huntsman, roughly $500 million worth. Starboard did not succeed in gaining seats on the company's board, one of its goals and decided to completely exit their position within Huntsman.

Business segments
Advanced Materials is a supplier of synthetic and formulated polymer systems. Huntsman’s epoxy, acrylic and polyurethane-based polymer products are used to replace traditional materials in aircraft, automobiles and electrical power transmission. Epoxy-based adhesives are also sold in the B2C segment primarily in India, Brazil & some parts of Europe under the brand name Araldite. The roots date back to 1758, when J.R. Geigy Ltd., the oldest chemicals company in Basel, Switzerland, began trading in chemicals and dyes. Huntsman acquired the Advanced Materials business from Vantico back in 2003.

Polyurethanes manufactures MDI-based polyurethane solutions used in an extensive range of applications and market sectors. Polyurethanes provide key benefits of energy efficiency, comfort, and well-being. Insulation products conserve energy in housing and commercial properties and play a critical role in the food supply chain – keeping products at the right temperature in refrigerated vehicles, chiller cabinets, and refrigerators. Polyurethanes also provide comfort and well-being in automotive seating, furniture, bedding, and footwear. Adhesive products, coatings, and elastomers are used extensively throughout consumer and industrial applications.

Performance Products manufactures products primarily based on amines, carbonates, surfactants, and maleic anhydride. End uses include agrochemicals; oil, gas, and alternative energy solutions; home detergents and personal care products; adhesives and coatings; mining; and curing agents for polyurethane and epoxy.

Textile Effects manufactures and markets textile dyes and chemicals that enhance color and improve performance such as fade resistance, UV-blocking and the ability to repel water and stains in apparel, home, and technical textiles.

Controversy
During the 2022 Russian invasion of Ukraine, Huntsman Corporation refused to join the international community and withdraw from the Russian market. Research from Yale University updated on April 28, 2022 identifying how companies were reacting to Russia's invasion identified Huntsman in the worst category of "Digging In", meaning Defying Demands for Exit: companies defying demands for exit/reduction of activities.

References

External links

Chemical companies of the United States
Companies listed on the New York Stock Exchange
Chemical companies established in 1970
Manufacturing companies based in Texas
Companies based in The Woodlands, Texas
1970 establishments in Utah
2005 initial public offerings